Haroun Conteh (born January 20, 2005) is an American soccer player who plays as a defender for USL League One club North Carolina FC.

Club career
In 2019, Conteh joined the Real Salt Lake academy in Arizona after a season with the Phoenix Rising academy. He appeared for Salt Lake's USL Championship team on June 23, 2021, starting in a 1–1 draw with Tacoma Defiance.

In 2022, Conteh made the move to join USL League One side North Carolina FC.

Career statistics

Club

References

External links
 Profile at U.S. Soccer Development Academy

2005 births
Living people
People from Glendale, Arizona
American soccer players
Association football defenders
North Carolina FC players
North Carolina FC U23 players
Real Monarchs players
USL Championship players
Soccer players from Arizona
USL League One players